Quảng Trị is a district-level town in Quảng Trị Province in the North Central Coast region of Vietnam. It is second of two municipalities in the province after the provincial capital Đông Hà.

History
The Sino-Vietnamese name Quảng Trị (廣治) was given by Vietnamese Confucian administrators.

A major feature of the town is the Quảng Trị Citadel, built in 1824, as a military bastion during the 4th year of the reign of Minh Mạng. It is an example of Vauban architecture and it later became the administrative head office of the Nguyễn dynasty in Quảng Trị Province (1809–1945).

Quảng Trị was an area of early Catholic presence and by 1913, the nearest railway station to the starting point of the La Vang pilgrimage.

During the Vietnam War, when the province was the South's border with North Vietnam, it suffered a major attack in the January 1968 Tet Offensive and it was the only South Vietnamese provincial capital to be captured by the North Vietnamese forces in the 1972 Easter Offensive before being recaptured in September 1972.

Notable residents 

 Hieu Van Le, Governor of the Australian state of South Australia, was born here in 1954.

References

External links
The 1968 Tet Offensive Battles of Quang Tri City and Hue

Districts of Quảng Trị province
County-level towns in Vietnam